Simiskina pheretia  is a butterfly in the family Lycaenidae. It was described by William Chapman Hewitson in 1874. It is found in the Indomalayan realm.

Subspecies
Simiskina pheretia pheretia (Peninsular Malaysia, Borneo, possibly Singapore)
Simiskina pheretia maina (Fruhstorfer, 1917) (northern Borneo)
Simiskina pheretia bilitis (Fruhstorfer, 1919) (north-eastern Sumatra)

References

External links
Simiskina at Markku Savela's Lepidoptera and Some Other Life Forms

Simiskina
Butterflies described in 1874
Butterflies of Asia
Taxa named by William Chapman Hewitson